Columbia Law School (CLS) is the law school of Columbia University, a private Ivy League university in New York City. Columbia Law is widely regarded as one of the most prestigious law schools in the world and has always ranked in the top five schools in the United States since the establishment of the law school rankings by U.S. News & World Report  in 1987. Columbia Law is especially well known for its strength in corporate law and its placement power in the nation's elite law firms.

Columbia Law School was founded in 1858 as the Columbia College Law School, and was known for its legal scholarship dating back to the 18th century. Graduates of the university's colonial predecessor, King's College, include such notable early-American legal figures as John Jay, the first chief justice of the United States, and Alexander Hamilton, the first Secretary of the Treasury, who were co-authors of The Federalist Papers.

Columbia Law has many distinguished alumni, including United States presidents Theodore Roosevelt and Franklin Delano Roosevelt; nine justices of the Supreme Court of the United States; numerous U.S. Cabinet members and presidential advisers; US senators; representatives; governors; and more members of the Forbes 400 than any other law school in the world.

According to Columbia Law School's 2021 ABA-required disclosures; 98.3 percent of the Class of 2021 obtained employment within ten months of graduation, with the 25th percentile, median, and 75th percentile starting base salary for graduates all being $215,000.  Since 2014, the law school has been ranked No. 1 on the National Law Journals "Go-To Law Schools" ranking, which measures the percentage of graduates securing employment at the largest 100 law firms in the U.S.

History

James Kent and the early study of law at Columbia University

The teaching of law at Columbia reaches back to the 18th century. Graduates of the university's colonial predecessor, King's College, included such notable early American judicial figures as John Jay, who would later become the first Chief Justice of the United States. Columbia College appointed its first professor of law, James Kent, in 1793. The lectures of Chancellor Kent in the course of four years had developed into the first two volumes of his Commentaries, the second volume being published November 1827. Kent did not, however, succeed in establishing a law school or department in the College. Thus, the formal instruction of law as a course of study did not commence until the middle of the 19th century.

Theodore Dwight and the founding of the law school

The Columbia College Law School, as it was then officially called, was founded in 1858.  Classes were originally held on Colonnade Row in a building once owned by John Jacob Astor. The first purpose-built law school building was a Gothic Revival structure located on Columbia's Madison Avenue campus, which also house the college library. Thereafter, the college became Columbia University and moved north to the neighborhood of Morningside Heights. As Columbia Law Professor Theodore Dwight observed, at its founding the demand for a formal course of study in law was still speculative:

It was considered at that time mainly as an experiment. No institution resembling a law school had ever existed in New York. Most of the leading lawyers had obtained their training in offices or by private reading, and were highly skeptical as to the possibility of securing competent legal knowledge by means of professional schools. Legal education was, however, at a very low ebb. The clerks in the law offices were left almost wholly to themselves. Frequently they were not even acquainted with the lawyers with whom, by a convenient fiction, they were supposed to be studying. Examinations for admission to the bar were held by committees appointed by the courts, who, where they inquired at all, sought for the most part to ascertain the knowledge of the candidate of petty details of practice. In general, the examinations were purely perfunctory. A politician of influence was not readily turned away. Few studied law as a science; many followed it as a trade or as a convenient ladder whereby to rise in a political career."

Indeed, Columbia Law School was one of the few law schools established in the United States before the Civil War. During the 18th and 19th centuries, most legal education took place in law offices, where young men, serving as apprentices or clerks, were set to copying documents and filling out legal forms under the supervision of an established attorney. For example, in New York John Jay, revolutionary founding father and first Chief Justice of the Supreme Court of the United States, read law with Benjamin Kissam, whose busy practice kept his clerks occupied in transcribing records, pleadings, and opinions. Jay was fortunate to have attentive supervision because the quality and time of learning the law varied greatly within the profession. Theodore Dwight, who had been head of the law department of Hamilton College in Clinton, New York, believed formal legal education, conducted in the classroom with regular lectures, was far superior to casual law office instruction.

At its founding, four distinct courses of lectures of this class were then established: one on Philology, offered by distinguished scholar and statesman, George P. Marsh; a second by Dr. Francis Lieber, a standard writer upon topics of political science and of international law, then a professor at Columbia College; a third course on Ethics, by Professor Nairne, also of the College; and a fourth on Municipal Law, by Theodore W. Dwight, then Professor of Law in Hamilton College, New York, which at the time already had a flourishing law school.  The original course of study to obtain a degree consisted of just two years, rather than the modern standard of three. The first lecture in the law school was delivered on Monday, November 1, 1858, by Mr. Dwight, at the rooms of the Historical Society. It was an introductory lecture, afterwards printed. The audience consisted mainly of lawyers. It was plain that many of them could be counted upon as friends of a system of legal education. The result was an immediate attendance of 35 students, who showed their intention of pursuing a regular course of study by at once paying a tuition fee for instruction throughout the year. Such assurances were given of a future increase of numbers that it was determined to divide each class at the beginning of the coming year into two sections, for their convenience. The next year, the number of students was 62; in the third year, there were 103. Many of these early students were members of the bar. In 1860, in order to stimulate excellence in attainments of the students, a series of annual prizes was established, commencing with $250, and diminishing regularly by $50, until the sum of $100 was reached. These were adjudicated by leading members of the bar upon the combined merits of written answers to printed questions, and of essays upon topics selected by the instructors. None could compete for the prizes except those who had fully completed the two years' course. The questions covered the range of studies for the whole course. Stringent rules were adopted in reference to the answers, so as to secure the absolute fidelity of the candidates in their work.

The Dwight Method

Professor Dwight believed a course of legal study should focus on the application of basic legal principles, as learned through the study of legal treatises, coupled with frequent moot courts which would permit students to demonstrate their proficiency in applying those principles to new legal problems.  In this way, Dwight's method of teaching diverged significantly from the "case method" which had then been popularized by Dean Langdell of the Harvard Law School which focused on the study of individual cases and the use of inductive reasoning to distill governing legal principles from those cases with little time spent on the practical application of those principles.

Dwight believed that his method was superior to the case method because it helped to create trained legal practitioners ready to enter the profession rather than academics more suited to teaching. In support of his position, Dwight cited the example of legal study throughout the Western World since the Roman empire: It is not out of place in this connection to refer to the chosen methods of acquiring the Roman law, both as sanctioned by great jurists and by imperial authority, after an experience continuing through centuries . . . The Roman jurists had "cases" to deal with, precisely as we do. They were not mere legal philosophers, but disposed of practical and "burning" questions of their time. They were, however, in the habit of referring back to a legal principle in disposing of a concrete case, and believed that great principles could be so stated as to win the attention of students and give them a solid basis for future detailed acquisitions.

By the late 19th century, Dwight's method gave way to the case method which by the turn of the 20th century had become the standard curriculum at all of the other premier American law schools at Harvard, Yale and the University of Pennsylvania. In 1891, in response to Columbia's adoption of the case method, Dwight and a number of other professors left the law school to found New York Law School in Manhattan's Financial District.

Columbia Law in the 20th century

After Dwight's departure, William Albert Keener of Harvard Law School became dean of the law school from 1891 to 1901 when he was succeeded by George Washington Kirchwey. Future Supreme Court Justice Harlan Fiske Stone graduated from the law school in 1898. While practicing law in New York, he began lecturing at Columbia Law School in 1899 and joined the faculty as a full professor. He subsequently became dean of the law school in 1910 and held the position until 1923 when he left to join Sullivan and Cromwell as a partner. Stone became Attorney General of the United States in 1924 and held that Office for almost a year before joining the Supreme Court of the United States as an associate justice.

In the 1920s and 30s, the law school soon became known for the development of the legal realism movement. Among the major realists affiliated with Columbia Law School were Karl Llewellyn, Felix S. Cohen and William O. Douglas.

In September 1988, Columbia Law School founded the first AIDS Law Clinic in the country, taught by Professor Deborah Greenberg and Mark Barnes.

Rankings

Since U.S. News & World Report began ranking law schools in 1987, Columbia Law has been rated in the top five annually, along with Yale, Harvard, and Stanford. U.S. News & World Report consistently places Columbia Law among the top law schools (for both academic reputation and national standing), and currently ranks Columbia Law 4th (tied with Harvard Law). For 2021, U.S. News & World Report ranks Columbia Law No. 1 for Business/Corporate Law and No. 1 for Contracts/Commercial Law and No. 4 in its Law Firm Recruiters' Ranking of Best Law Schools.

Forbes magazine ranks Columbia Law No. 1 for Best Law Schools for Career Prospects as well as No. 1 for Highest Earning Law Graduates.

In 2012, the QS World University Rankings ranked Columbia Law School the 5th best law school in the world.

Since 2014, the law school has been ranked No. 1 on the National Law Journals Go to Law Schools ranking, which measures the percentage of graduates securing employment at the largest 100 law firms in the U.S.

Columbia Law School in the 21st century

Several of the faculty are recipients of the MacArthur Fellows Program "genius grant". The following list of disciplines enumerates some of Columbia Law School's notable scholars:

 Administrative law:
 Richard Briffault
 Jessica Bulman-Pozen
 Thomas Merrill
 Gillian E. Metzger
 Peter Strauss
 Civil rights, Human rights law
 Sarah Cleveland
 Kimberlé Williams Crenshaw
 Katherine Franke
 Olatunde C. Johnson
 Sarah Knuckey
 Kendall Thomas
 Constitutional law
 Philip Bobbitt
 Lee Bollinger
 Henry Monaghan
 Corporate law, U.S. securities regulation:
 John C. Coffee Jr.
 Merritt Fox
 Ronald Gilson
 Jeffrey N. Gordon
 Zohar Goshen
 Joshua Mitts
 Edward R. Morrison
 Eric Talley
 Criminal law and procedure:
 George P. Fletcher
 Debra Ann Livingston
 Gerard E. Lynch
 Jed S. Rakoff
 Environmental law:
 Michael Gerrard
 Thomas W. Merrill
 Jedediah Purdy
 Intellectual property:
 Jane Ginsburg
 Lina Khan
 Clarisa Long
 Eben Moglen
 Tim Wu
 International and Comparative law:
 George Bermann
 Sarah Cleveland
 Lori Damrosch
 Michael Doyle
 Benjamin L. Liebman
 Legal history:
 Barbara Aronstein Black
 Kellen R. Funk
 Maeve Glass
 Jeremy K. Kessler
 Eben Moglen
 Christina Duffy Ponsa-Kraus
 Sarah Seo
First Amendment
Vincent Blasi
Lee Bollinger
Tim Wu
David Pozen
Donald Verrilli
Jeremy Kessler
 Legal philosophy
 Kent Greenawalt
 Bernard Harcourt
 Christina D. Ponsa-Kraus
 Charles Sabel
 William H. Simon

Law centers and programs

Columbia University was among the first schools to establish both comparative and international law centers, as well as an effective space law department. The law school also has major centers for the study of international law, including the Center for Chinese Legal Studies, the Center for Korean Legal Studies, the Center for Japanese Legal Studies (the first and only center of its kind in the United States), the European Legal Studies Center, the Sabin Center for Climate Change Law, the Center on Corporate Governance, the Center for Gender & Sexuality Law, the Center for Law and Economic Studies, the Center on Global Legal Transformation, as well as several other centers and law programs. In July 2012, the law school launched the Ira M. Millstein Center for Global Markets and Corporate Ownership to "study global financial markets and their diverse, interdependent actors"; the Center for Constitutional Governance to "bring together a dynamic roster of constitutional scholars who are deeply engaged in the study of governmental structure and relationships, including experts on separation of powers and issues of federalism"; and the Center for International Commercial and Investment Arbitration to "further the teaching and study of international arbitration, building on the Law School's considerable expertise in this rapidly growing area of legal practice."

On May 26, 2009, President Barack Obama nominated Judge Sonia Sotomayor, a  Lecturer-in-Law since 1999, to be a Justice of the Supreme Court of the United States. Judge Sotomayor created and co-taught a course entitled "The Federal Appellate Externship" every semester at the law school since the fall 2000. Federal Appellate Externships and many other externships, including Federal District Externships, are offered each year at Columbia Law.

Among other externships, the law school offers a full-semester externship on the federal government in Washington, D.C., which provides students hands-on experience in government law offices. In addition to their placements at federal agencies, students in the program are also required to attend a weekly seminar and write a substantive research paper. The Federal Government Externship has the following three specific components:

 Field Placements: Students are required to work a minimum of 30 hours a week doing substantive legal work at a federal agency. Options include, amongst others, several sections of the Department of Justice, the Securities and Exchange Commission, the Environmental Protection Agency, the Federal Communications Commission, the Department of Health and Human Services, and the Department of Homeland Security, 
 Seminar: Students conduct an in-depth analysis of the roles lawyers play in federal offices. Each seminar is taught by Columbia Law faculty and a Washington-based adjunct professor. Each seminar also features guest speakers and has a substantive writing component. 
 Supervised Research: Students are required to produce an 8,000–10,000-word research paper on a topic closely connected to their externship and field placement. Externs are encouraged to consult with the agency in which they work to develop their topic.

Arthur W. Diamond Library

Columbia Law School's Arthur W. Diamond Library is one of the most comprehensive libraries in the world and is the third largest private academic law library in the United States, with over 1,000,000 volumes and subscriptions to more than 7,450 journals and other serials.

The Columbia Law Review and other student journals

The Columbia Law Review is the third-most-cited law journal in the world and is one of the four publishers of the Bluebook. Columbia Law publishes thirteen other student-edited journals, including the Columbia Business Law Review, Columbia Human Rights Law Review (which in turn publishes A Jailhouse Lawyer's Manual), Columbia Journal of Asian Law, Columbia Journal of Environmental Law, Columbia Journal of European Law, Columbia Journal of Gender and Law, Columbia Journal of Law & the Arts, Columbia Journal of Law & Social Problems, Columbia Journal of Race & Law, Columbia Journal of Tax Law, Columbia Journal of Transnational Law, Columbia Science and Technology Law Review, and the American Review of International Arbitration.

Joint degree programs

In December 2010, the law school announced the addition of an accelerated JD/MBA joint degree program, which allows students to obtain both a JD and MBA within three years. The accelerated program will not replace the existing four-year JD/MBA joint degree program. Interested students will be able to choose between the two programs. A joint degree can prove to be beneficial to law students' career objectives. To enable interested students to achieve this goal, the law school may approve a joint degree with any of the following of Columbia's graduate or professional schools:

 Graduate School of Arts and Sciences (Ph.D. in selected programs)
 School of Business
 School of International and Public Affairs (SIPA)
 Graduate School of Journalism
 School of the Arts
 School of Public Health
 School of Social Work
 School of Architecture, Planning and Preservation

Dual degree programs and alliances, abroad

Columbia has cultivated alliances and dual degree programs with overseas law schools, including the University of Oxford, King's College London, University College London, and the London School of Economics in London, England; the Institut d'études politiques de Paris ("Sciences Po") and the Université Panthéon-Sorbonne in Paris, France; the University of Amsterdam in the Netherlands; and the Institute for Law and Finance (ILF) at Goethe University Frankfurt in Frankfurt, Germany. The double degree options include JD/Masters in French Law (4 year program in Paris), JD/Masters Program in Global Business (3 Year program in Paris), JD/LLM (3 year program in London), LLB/JD (4 year program in London), and JD/LLM (4 year program in Frankfurt).

Columbia Law School has one of the largest international alliances with China, and with Peking University, specifically, a joint exchange program that began in 2006 when students could be exchanged for a semester, which was expanded as a program in 2011 to allow faculty to teach or co-teach courses abroad, and which was expanded as a program again in 2013 when Columbia Law School dean David Schizer and Peking University Law School dean Zhang Shouwen signed a memorandum of understanding between the universities, allowing for joint publications and joint seminars between faculty at the respective universities.

Clinical and experiential learning programs

The law school runs several clinical programs that contribute to the community, including the nation's first technology-based clinic, called Lawyering in the Digital Age. This clinic is currently engaged in building a community resource to understand the collateral consequences of criminal charges. In April 2006, Columbia announced that it was starting the nation's first clinic in sexuality and gender law. The Sexuality and Gender Law Clinic "is the first law school clinic anywhere in the U.S. directed by a full-time law school faculty member and dedicated to legal and public policy issues related to gender and sexuality." In 2007, Columbia opened a new program in law and technology.

Given that Columbia is well known for its strength in corporate law, the law school offers, for example, a "Deals" course that includes participants from the Columbia Business School and the law school. In addition, the Columbia Business and Law Association (CBLA), the law school's principal student group dedicated to the interaction between law and business, routinely sponsors lectures, workshops, and networking events from traditional areas of interest such as investment banking, management consulting, venture capital, private equity, hedge funds, and entrepreneurship. CBLA also serves as a center for members of the Columbia Law School community interested in many aspects of business law, including corporate governance and securities regulation.

Facilities

Columbia Law School's main building, Jerome L. Greene Hall, was designed by Wallace Harrison and Max Abramovitz, architects of the United Nations Headquarters and Lincoln Center for the Performing Arts (which for many years served as the site of Columbia Law School's graduation ceremonies). It is located at the intersection of Amsterdam Avenue and West 116th Street. One of the building's defining features is its frontal sculpture, Bellerophon Taming Pegasus, designed by Jacques Lipchitz, symbolizing man's struggle over (his own) wild side/unreason.

In 1996, the law school was given an extensive renovation and expansion by Polshek Partnership (now Ennead Architects), including the addition of a new entrance façade and three story skylit lobby, as well as the expansion of existing space to include an upper-level students' commons, lounge areas, and a café. In the summer of 2008, construction of a new floor in Jerome Greene Hall was completed providing 38 new faculty offices. Other Columbia Law School buildings include William and June Warren Hall, the Jerome Greene Annex (which Jerome Greene's representatives politely declined to have renamed after the building of Jerome Greene Hall), and William C. Warren Hall (or "Little Warren").

Lenfest Hall, the law school's premier residence, opened in August 2003. The hall was named for H. F. Lenfest '58 and his wife Marguerite. Lenfest contains more than 200 luxury student residences, including private studio apartments and one-bedroom apartments.  In addition to Lenfest Hall, the majority of Columbia Law students live in the university's Graduate Student Housing consisting of single and shared apartments in buildings throughout Morningside Heights. All Columbia Law students are guaranteed housing on campus for the duration of their law school studies.

The school reported in December 2020 that its Center for Chinese Legal Studies will be named for Hong Yen Chang, the school′s first Chinese graduate in 1886 and the country′s first Chinese American lawyer.

Columbia graduate legal studies program

Columbia offers a Graduate Legal Studies Program, including the Master of Laws (LL.M.) and the Doctor of the Science of Law (J.S.D.) degrees. The LL.M. Program is considered one of the best in the United States and has been ranked very highly according to private studies. Each year the law school enrolls approximately 210 graduate students from more than 50 countries with experience in all areas of the legal profession, including academia, the judiciary, public service, civil rights and human rights advocacy, non-governmental organizations, international organizations, and private practice. Graduate students are an important component of the law school community. They participate in many co-curricular activities, including student journals, moot courts, and student organizations. Graduate students also organize and speak at conferences, workshops, and colloquia on current legal issues.

U.S. Supreme Court clerkships

Since 2005, 24 Columbia Law alumni have served as judicial clerks at the United States Supreme Court, one of the most distinguished appointments a law school graduate can obtain. This record gives Columbia a ranking of fifth among all law schools for supplying such law clerks for the period 2005–2017. Columbia has placed 135 clerks at the U.S. Supreme Court in its history, one of the top five law schools for clerks; this group includes Lee Bollinger, who clerked for Chief Justice Warren Burger in the 1972 Term, and is now the president of Columbia University.

Employment
According to Columbia Law School's official 2014 ABA-required disclosures, 93.8 percent of the Class of 2014 obtained full-time, long-term, JD-required employment ten months after graduation. Columbia Law School's Law School Transparency under-employment score was 1.6 percent, indicating the percentage of the Class of 2013 unemployed, pursuing an additional degree, or working in a non-professional, short-term, or part-time job nine months after graduation.

Costs
The total cost of attendance (indicating the cost of tuition, fees, and living expenses) at Columbia Law School for the 2019–2020 academic year was $101,345. The Law School Transparency estimated debt-financed cost of attendance for three years is $357,503.

Columbia Law School alumni

Theodore Roosevelt, the 26th president of the United States and the 25th vice president of the United States, and Franklin D. Roosevelt, the 32nd president of the United States, were students at CLS; neither graduated from CLS, but they both received honorary J.D.s in October 2008. Former President of Georgia, Mikheil Saakashvili, received his LL.M. at Columbia; Giuliano Amato, twice former Prime Minister of Italy (1992–93 and 2000–2001), was also a CLS graduate. Graduates of the law school have served as members of the United States President's Cabinet and non-U.S. government executive cabinets, including U.S. Secretary of State, Secretary of Treasury, Secretary of War (now U.S. Secretary of Defense), and Attorney General, among others.

Three of the school's graduates have served as Chief Justice of the United States: Charles Evans Hughes, Harlan Fiske Stone, and John Jay. Columbia Law School is the only law school to have graduated more than one chief justice. Ten alumni of Columbia Law School have served on the Supreme Court of the United States, including Justice Ruth Bader Ginsburg. Several alumni have served as United States Solicitor General. There are over 90 current and past members of the U.S. federal courts who have graduated from CLS. Internationally, CLS graduates also have occupied prominent judicial positions, including Shi Jiuyong, former president of the International Court of Justice (ICJ); Xue Hanqin, current member of the ICJ; Giuliano Amato, current member of the Constitutional Court of Italy; Jan Schans Christensen ('88 LL.M.), current member of the Supreme Court of Denmark; Susan Denham, current Chief Justice, Supreme Court of Ireland; Marvic Leonen ('04 LL.M.), current member of the Supreme Court of the Philippines; Hironobu Takesaki, current Chief Justice of the Supreme Court of Japan; Umu Hawa Tejan-Jalloh, current Chief Justice, Supreme Court of Sierra Leone; Karin Maria Bruzelius, former member of the Supreme Court of Norway; Lawrence Collins, former Justice of the Supreme Court of the United Kingdom; and Francis M. Ssekandi, former justice of the Supreme Court of Uganda, among others.

Notable legal academics who are graduates of CLS include Barbara Black, Lee Bollinger, Felix S. Cohen, Lawrence Collins, Robert Cover, Samuel Estreicher, E. Allan Farnsworth, Charles Fried, Ruth Bader Ginsburg, Harvey Goldschmid, Kent Greenawalt, Jack Greenberg, Geoffrey C. Hazard Jr., Benjamin Kaplan, Jessica Litman, Louis Lusky, Yale Kamisar, Soia Mentschikoff, Richard B. Morris, Paula Franzese, Robert Pitofsky, Barbara Ringer, Lawrence Sager, Michael I. Sovern, Arthur T. Vanderbilt, Charles Warren, Amy Wax, Herbert Wechsler, and Mark D. West.

In 2015, the positions of Attorney General of the United States (Eric Holder), Solicitor General (Don Verrilli), and the Assistant Attorney General for the Criminal Division (Lanny Breuer) were all occupied by graduates of the law school.

CLS alumni are also notable in the arts, business, and elsewhere. For example, civil rights activist, recording artist, and actor Paul Robeson received his law degree from CLS in 1923. Academy Award-winning lyricist and playwright Oscar Hammerstein II attended the law school. Moe Berg was a Major League Baseball player, and a spy for the United States. Alumni of the law school have been the president or founder of more than 30 colleges and universities in the nation.

Entrepreneur and former 2020 Presidential candidate Andrew Yang is also an alumnus.

Columbia Law School in popular culture
 Marvel Comics character Matthew Murdock, the alter ego of superhero Daredevil, and his roommate and eventual law partner, Franklin "Foggy" Nelson, attended Columbia Law School.
 On the television show Law & Order, District Attorney Adam Schiff and Assistant District Attorney Jamie Ross studied law at Columbia.
 In Body Heat, Edmund Walker (played by Richard Crenna), the wealthy husband of the film's femme fatale, is a Columbia Law School graduate.
 In the film Old School, Dean Gordon Pritchard bribes the student body president by guaranteeing her admission to Columbia Law.
 In the film Just Cause, Law Professor Paul Armstrong, played by Sir Sean Connery, is a Columbia Law graduate.
 In the film Two Weeks Notice, Howard Wade, played by David Haig, asks for a lawyer trained at Columbia Law School.
 On the television show How I Met Your Mother, the character Marshall Eriksen is an Environmental Law graduate of Columbia Law School.
 On The West Wing (S5), Angela (the new head of legislative affairs at the White House) meets Leo to talk about the President's high popularity in polls during the time of his daughter's kidnapping. When Leo says that the President's temporary self-removal from office was a constitutional necessity, Angela comments on the negative political ramifications and tells Leo, "If you want a Constitutional debate, call the Dean of Columbia Law."
 On the television show Raising the Bar, the character Judge Trudy Kessler is a Columbia Law alumna.*
 In the novel Portnoy's Complaint, protagonist Alex Portnoy attended Columbia Law School.
 In the film Veronica Mars (film), protagonist Veronica Mars attended Columbia Law School before returning home to pursue a life as a private investigator.
 On the television show Modern Family, one of the main characters, Mitchell Prichett, is a Columbia Law School graduate.
 In the television series Suits, Rachel Zane (played by Meghan Markle), is a part-time student of Columbia Law School.

See also
 List of deans of Columbia Law School

References

External links

 
 U.S. News & World Report Columbia Law School Profile

 
Columbia University
Environmental law schools
Law schools in New York City
Universities and colleges in Manhattan
1858 establishments in New York (state)
Educational institutions established in 1858